Francisco José Millán Mon (born 8 March 1955) is a Spanish politician and
Member of the European Parliament with the People's Party, part of the European People's Party.
Mon was born in Pontevedra.  He sits on the European Parliament's Committee on Foreign Affairs, and is a substitute for the Committee on Development and a member of the
Delegation to the Euro-Mediterranean Parliamentary Assembly.

Education
 1977: Graduate in law (Santiago de Compostela)
 1979: Diploma in International Studies (School of Diplomacy, Madrid)
 1980: Start of diplomatic career

Career
 1980-1982: Directorate-general of Consular Affairs, Ministry of Foreign Affairs
 1982-1984: International legal adviser, Ministry of Foreign Affairs
 1984-1987: First Secretary of the Spanish Embassy in Bonn
 1987-1991: Cabinet of the Secretary-General for Foreign Policy, Ministry of Foreign Affairs
 1991-1993: Director of the cabinet of the Secretary-General for Relations with the European Communities
 1993-1996: First consul at the Spanish Embassy in Rabat
 1996-1998: Director of the Cabinet of the Secretary-General for Foreign Policy and the European Union
 1998-2000: Director-General for Europe, Ministry of Foreign Affairs
 2000-2003: Adviser to the First Deputy Prime Minister of the Spanish Government
 Holder of several Spanish and foreign decorations

See also
 2004 European Parliament election in Spain

External links
 
 

1955 births
Living people
People's Party (Spain) MEPs
MEPs for Spain 2004–2009
MEPs for Spain 2009–2014
MEPs for Spain 2014–2019
MEPs for Spain 2019–2024